KRPU 1210 AM is a South Asian station, focused on the local Indian and Pakistani communities, calling itself "Prime Asia Radio."  Previously "Radio Punjab" and "Spice Radio". It's city of license is Rocklin, California and serves the Sacramento market. Its transmitters are located in Roseville, California (nighttime) and near Rancho Murieta (daytime). The station went on the air on April 22, 1988.

The station was formerly an owned-and-operated affiliate of the non-commercial Christian radio network, Family Radio, airing religious music and bible talks from radio evangelist Harold Camping. From late 1991 to May 2003, Family Radio simulcast its programming on both 1210 AM and on KEBR-FM at 89.3 MHz in North Highlands, California, but this FM station was sold to KQED and became KQEI-FM as an NPR news and talk station. Family Radio's current FM outlet in Sacramento is KEBR 88.1 FM.

An application for consent to assign KEBR's license from Family Stations, Inc. to Spice Radio, Inc. was accepted for filing by the U.S. Federal Communications Commission on April 13, 2015. The asset purchase agreement dated March 31, 2015 states that the purchase price is $600,000. The transaction was consummated on September 4, 2015.

It has separate transmitter sites for day and night operation.

The station changed its call sign to the current KRPU on September 18, 2015.

References

External links

RPU
Radio stations established in 1989